Robert Montague (born 1965) is a Jamaican politician with the Jamaica Labour Party. He comes from a political family; his father Asquith Nathaniel was a charter member of the JLP. He entered politics in 1990 as a councillor for Carron Hall, Saint Mary Parish. He later became the mayor of Port Maria. In 2012, Opposition Leader Andrew Holness named him a member of the Senate of Jamaica. He is now the Minister of Transport And Mining in the Andrew Holness-led government after winning the 2016 Jamaican general election. He is the MP for the Saint Mary Western constituency.

References

Living people
Jamaica Labour Party politicians
1965 births
Members of the Senate of Jamaica
Government ministers of Jamaica
Members of the 13th Parliament of Jamaica
Members of the 14th Parliament of Jamaica